The 1984 Balkan Bulgarian Tupolev Tu-134 crash occurred on 10 January 1984 when a Balkan Bulgarian Airlines Tupolev Tu-134 airliner crashed on an international flight from Berlin Schönefeld Airport in Schönefeld, East Germany, to Sofia Airport in Sofia, Bulgaria. All fifty on board were killed.

While on approach to Sofia Airport in heavy snow, the crew failed to make visual contact with the ground as they descended below decision altitude. The aircraft was destroyed with no survivors.

Passengers
Thirty-eight passengers and the crew were Bulgarians, the other seven on the flight were East Germans.

References 

 UK CAA Document CAA 429 World Airline Accident Summary (ICAO Summary 1984-5)

Aviation accidents and incidents in 1984
Airliner accidents and incidents caused by weather
Airliner accidents and incidents caused by pilot error
Accidents and incidents involving the Tupolev Tu-134
Aviation accidents and incidents in Bulgaria
Balkan Bulgarian Airlines accidents and incidents
1984 in Bulgaria
January 1984 events in Europe
1984 disasters in Bulgaria